DMAX is a Southeast Asian pay television channel centred on broadcasting documentaries, factual-entertainment, lifestyle and reality programming TV series for male audiences.

It is owned by Discovery Asia-Pacific, a division of Warner Bros. Discovery In South Asia, the channel is available under the Discovery Turbo name carrying the same content and schedule.

History 
The channel was launched in 2004 as Discovery Real Time and rebranded as Discovery Turbo in 2008. It was rebranded on 7 July 2014 as DMAX with the airing of American Digger at 6:00 AM (UTC+8).
Some of its shows are also broadcast on Discovery Channel in Motor Mania every Thursday nights.

Programmes 

 Airplane Repo
 Alaska: The Last Frontier
 American Chopper
 American Digger
 American Loggers
 American Muscle
 America's Worst Tattoos
 Around The World in 80 Ways
 Artifact or Fiction
 Backyard Oil
 #BikerLive
 Bounty Wars
 Car Chasers
 Car Crazy Central
 Car That Rocks with Brian Johnson
 Chasing Classic Cars
 Chop Shop: London Garage
 Chrome Underground
 Dallas Cars Sharks
 Desert Car Kings
 The Devils Ride
 Dukes of Haggle
 Extreme Car Hoarders
 FantomWorks
 Fat N' Furious: Rolling Thunder
 Fast N' Loud
 Fifth Gear
 The Fighters
 Flying Wild Alaska
 The Garage
 High Tech Rednecks
 Inside West Coast Customs
 Last Car Standing
 Mighty Planes
 Mighty Ships
 Machine Morphers
 The Motorbike Show
 Out of Control Drivers
 Outrageous 911
 Overhaulin'
 Porter Ridge
 Property Wars
 Railroad Alaska
 Restoration Garage
 Rods N' Wheels
 Smokin' Sundays
 Swamp Loggers
 Trick My What?
 Twist the Throttle
 Unique Whips Special Edition
 Warlock Rising
 What's in the Barn?
 Wheeler Dealers
 Wrecked

See also 
 DMAX (TV channel)
 DMAX (UK TV channel)
 DMAX (Italy)

References

External links 
 

Asia
Television channels and stations established in 2014
Men's interest channels
Television channel articles with incorrect naming style
Warner Bros. Discovery Asia-Pacific